Silene biafrae is a species of plant in the family Caryophyllaceae. It is endemic to Cameroon.  Its natural habitat is subtropical or tropical dry lowland grassland.

References

Flora of Cameroon
biafrae
Vulnerable plants
Taxonomy articles created by Polbot